The Raf kinase inhibitor protein (RKIP) is a kinase inhibitor protein, that regulates many signaling pathways within the cell. RKIP is a member of the phosphatidylethanolamine-binding protein family and has displayed disruptive regulation on the Raf-1-MEK1/2, ERK1/2 and NF-kappaB signalling pathways, by interaction with the Raf-1 kinase.
RKIP has also been shown to inhibit G protein coupled receptor kinases (GRK) when phosphorylated by protein kinase C. Via this mechanism it has been shown to exert beneficial effects on cardiac structure and function.

References

Protein kinase inhibitors